"American-Born Confused Desi" ("ABCD") is an informal term used to refer to South Asian Americans particularly of Indian, Pakistani or Bangladeshi origin, born or raised in the United States, in contrast to those who were born overseas and later settled in the USA.

Neologism

"ABCD" or "American-Born Confused Desi" has become a polarizing factor in the South Asian diaspora in the US, with first-generation immigrant parents and young South Asians of second or later generations. Though the term was originally coined in reference to Indian-Americans, it has been adopted by the South Asian diaspora at large. The term "desi" comes from the Hindi word .  The word has its origin in Sanskrit, and is pronounced desh in the Bengali language. "Desi" means "of the homeland" and is generally used by diasporas of India, Pakistan and Bangladesh. Although it is not used much in South Asia and not as a set identity like the diasporas do. The term has been commonly known among diasporas since at least the 1980s. The term "confused" is used to describe the psychological state of many second-generation South Asian Americans who struggle to balance values and traditions taught at home with attitudes and practices that are more conducive to the culture of The United States.

The longer and lesser known form "American Born Confused Desi, Emigrated From Gujarat, House In Jersey" is also occasionally seen; playing on the alphabet theme, it has been expanded for K-Z variously as "Kids Learning Medicine, Now Owning Property, Quite Reasonable Salary, Two Uncles Visiting, White Xenophobia, Yet Zestful" or "Keeping Lotsa Motels, Named Omkarnath Patel, Quickly Reaching Success Through Underhanded Vicious Ways, Xenophobic Yet Zestful". The former version of the A—Z expansion was proposed by South Asian immigrants as a reaction to the latter version that derogated them.

Cultural implications
Among South Asian Americans, the term may be considered divisive, as first generation South Asian Americans use it to criticize the Americanization and lack of belonging to Indian Asian culture they perceive in their second-generation peers or children. Writer Vijay Prashad describes the term as "ponderous and overused" and notes it as one of the mechanisms by which new immigrants attempt to make second-generation youth feel "culturally inadequate and unfinished".

Movies
The term American-Born Confused Desi first appeared in the movie American Desi (2001). ABCD: American-Born Confused Desi is a 2013 Malayalam language movie released in India. The film narrates the journey of two young American Malayalees to their motherland, Kerala, with the title based on the term "American-Born Confused Desi".

See also
American-born Chinese (ABC)

References

Further reading

 

Indian diaspora in the United States
Pakistani diaspora in the United States
Anti-Asian slurs
Asian-American issues
Human migration
Cultural generations
South Asian American
Stereotypes of Asian Americans
Stereotypes of South Asian people
Stereotypes of women

rmy:ABCD